The 1996 SEAT Open was a women's tennis tournament played on indoor carpet courts in Kockelscheuer, Luxembourg that was part of Tier III of the 1996 WTA Tour. It was the inaugural edition of the tournament and was held from 21 October until 27 October 1996. First-seeded Anke Huber won the singles title.

Finals

Singles

 Anke Huber defeated  Karina Habšudová 6–3, 6–0
 It was Huber's 3rd title of the year and the 10th of her career.

Doubles

 Kristie Boogert /  Nathalie Tauziat defeated  Barbara Rittner /  Dominique Van Roost 2–6, 6–4, 6–2
 It was Boogert's 3rd title of the year and the 3rd of her career. It was Tauziat's 2nd title of the year and the 15th of her career.

External links
 ITF tournament edition details
 Tournament draws

SEAT Open
Luxembourg Open
1996 in Luxembourgian tennis